This is a list of Japanese flags, past and present. Historically, each daimyō had his own flag. (See sashimono and uma-jirushi.)

National flags

Imperial flags

Governmental flags

Military flags

Self-Defense Force and Imperial Army/Navy

Japan Coast Guard

Historical flags

Daimyō Banners present in old paintings

Minorities

Cultural flags

Prefectural flags

Each modern prefecture has a unique flag, most often a bicolour geometric highly stylised design (mon), often incorporating the letters of Japanese writing system and resembling company logos. A distinct feature of these flags is that they use a palette of colours not usually found in flags, including orange, purple, aquamarine and brown.

Some prefectures also have alternative official flags called . They may be used on less formal occasions. Famous symbol flags include the one used in Tokyo.

Municipal flags

Most municipalities have unique flags. Like prefectural flags, most of them are with a bicolour geometric highly stylized symbol, often incorporating Japanese characters.

Political flags

References

 
Flags